Hard Happiness is a 1958 Soviet drama film directed by Aleksandr Stolper.

Plot 
The film takes place during the civil war. The film tells about a gypsy named Kolya, who ended up in a Russian village, where he was forced to fight his freedom and happiness.

Cast 
 Mikhail Kozakov as Nikolai Nagorny
 Valery Ashurov as young Nagorny
 Viktor Avdyushko as Seryoga Gvozdenko
 Yevgeny Leonov as Agafon
 Nina Golovina as Katya Yermolina
 Veriko Anjaparidze as Nagorny's grandmother
 Antonina Gunchenko as Maria
Nikolai Lutsenko as Lukyan
 Oleg Yefremov as ginger guy		
Nikita Kondratev as Timoshka
 Nikolay Smorchkov as Nikita
 Radner Muratov as gypsy uncle Petya
Nikolai Sergeyev as village headman Ovsei Yermolin
Nikolai Slichenko as gypsy from Lukyan's camp
Ivan Ryzhov as theater guard

References

External links 
 

1958 films
1950s Russian-language films
Soviet drama films
1958 drama films